Senator Wells may refer to:

Members of the United States Senate
John S. Wells (1803–1860), U.S. Senator from New Hampshire in 1855
William H. Wells (1769–1829), U.S. Senator from Delaware from 1799 to 1804 and from 1813 to 1817

United States state senate members
Andy Wells (American politician) (born 1954), North Carolina State Senate
Charles Wells (American politician) (1786–1866), Massachusetts State Senate
Erik Wells (born 1967), West Virginia State Senate
George H. Wells (1833–1905), Louisiana State Senate
Henry Gordon Wells (1879–1954), Massachusetts State Senate
Henry Jackson Wells (1823–1912), Massachusetts State Senate
Wellington Wells (1868–1954), Massachusetts State Senate
William Wells (general) (1837–1892), Vermont State Senate
Martin Welles (1787–1863), Connecticut State Senate

Members of the Senate of Canada
David Wells (politician) (born 1962),  Canadian senator from Newfoundland and Labrador since 2013